Marcin Janusz (born 31 July 1994) is a Polish professional volleyball player of Algerian descent. He is a member of the Poland national team, a silver medallist at the 2022 World Championship, and the 2022 Champions League winner. At the professional club level, he plays for ZAKSA Kędzierzyn-Koźle.

Career

Clubs
In 2015, Janusz came back to Skra Bełchatów. On 7 February 2016, alongside PGE Skra, he won the Polish Cup after beating ZAKSA in the final. In April 2016, he was a member of the same team which won a bronze medal in the 2015–16 PlusLiga season.

Honours

Clubs
 CEV Champions League
  2021/2022 – with ZAKSA Kędzierzyn-Koźle

 National championships
 2015/2016  Polish Cup, with PGE Skra Bełchatów
 2017/2018  Polish SuperCup, with PGE Skra Bełchatów
 2017/2018  Polish Championship, with PGE Skra Bełchatów
 2021/2022  Polish Cup, with ZAKSA Kędzierzyn-Koźle
 2021/2022  Polish Championship, with ZAKSA Kędzierzyn-Koźle
 2022/2023  Polish Cup, with ZAKSA Kędzierzyn-Koźle

Individual awards
 2018: Polish Cup – Best Setter
 2022: Polish Cup – Most Valuable Player

References

External links

 
 Player profile at PlusLiga.pl  
 Player profile at Volleybox.net

1994 births
Living people
Polish people of Algerian descent
Sportspeople from Nowy Sącz
Polish men's volleyball players
Skra Bełchatów players
AZS Częstochowa players
Effector Kielce players
Trefl Gdańsk players
ZAKSA Kędzierzyn-Koźle players
Setters (volleyball)